John Patrick "Jack" Douglass (born June 30, 1988), better known as jacksfilms, is an American YouTuber. Douglass began his online career in 2006. His YouTube channel initially consisted of infomercial parodies, sketches, and comedic music videos.

Personal and early life 

Douglass was born in Columbia, Maryland, on June 30, 1988, and is primarily of Irish ancestry. He has two older sisters. During high school he started to develop a love for music, and he learned to play the French horn and the piano. In May 2006, during his senior year of high school, he created short video sketches for a school assignment, leading him to decide to create films. The next month, he started using YouTube and uploading videos. After graduating from high school, Douglass attended American University, where he majored in film and minored in music theory.

On January 1, 2017, Douglass became engaged to his longtime partner Erin Breslin. The couple married on April 21, 2018. Douglass owns three American Eskimo dogs; their names are Klondike, Sundae, and Chipwich.

YouTube career 
Douglass launched his main YouTube channel jacksfilms on June 26, 2006. He uploaded "The WTF Blanket (Snuggie Parody)" on January 22, 2009, which is his most-viewed video as of March 2023, amassing 25.6 million views. Many of Douglass' early videos were parodies, often about infomercials, and Apple or Samsung phones. In June 2011, Douglass began the series Your Grammar Sucks, mocking internet comments with excessive grammatical and spelling errors. On June 27, 2013, the jacksfilms channel reached 1 million subscribers; this sits at a combined 5.33 million across his YouTube channels as of September 2022. In 2014, Douglass' channel jacksfilms was listed on NewMediaRockstars list of the top 100 YouTube channels, ranked at #54.

On January 8, 2014, Douglass launched JackAsk, a series in which he satirically answers viewers' questions. On February 3, 2015, Douglass launched Yesterday I Asked You (YIAY), a daily series in which he reads his favorite answers from the viewers of questions he previously asked.

In 2016 and 2017, Douglass released a series of phone commercial parodies, on the first-generation iPhone SE, Galaxy S8, and iPhone X. These parodies received media attention from CNET and Kotaku. On April 15, 2018, Douglass won the 2018 Shorty Award for YouTuber of the Year.

After Douglass made videos poking fun at The Emoji Movie, he received a package from the film's marketing team on July 20, 2017, thanking him for being "the [No. 1] fan of The Emoji Movie". They invited him to the world premiere on July 23, and sent Emoji Movie–related merchandise.

On January 4, 2021, Douglass announced YIAY TIME: The Game Show, a new YouTube Originals show. It premiered the next day on January 5, 2021, for free on Douglass's YouTube channel.

Appearances in other media 

Douglass played Intern 2 on MyMusic, a 2012 webseries funded by YouTube's $100 million original channel initiative. In 2014, Douglass voiced Jimmy in 16-Bit High, an animated series created by Smosh Games. In October 2015, Douglass played Pippen in the 2015 film Bob Thunder: Internet Assassin. Douglass appeared in the 2016 and 2017 editions of YouTube Rewind.

Awards

Notes

References 

Primary video and playlist sources
In the text these references are preceded by a double dagger (‡):

External links 

 
 Jack Douglass' GET JACK'D live chat series on Vokle 

 Douglass' music on Spotify

1988 births
American male musicians
American male songwriters
American male voice actors
American male web series actors
American people of Irish descent
American University alumni
American YouTubers
Atholton High School alumni
Comedy YouTubers
English-language YouTube channels
Fullscreen (company) people
Infomercial parodies
Living people
Musicians from Maryland
Music YouTubers
People from Columbia, Maryland
Shorty Award winners
Songwriters from Maryland
Streamy Award winners
Twitch (service) streamers
YouTube channels launched in 2006
YouTube vloggers